The Paloona Power Station is a conventional hydroelectric power station located in northern Tasmania, Australia.

Technical details
Part of the MerseyForth scheme that comprises seven hydroelectric power stations, the Paloona Power Station is the final station in the scheme. The power station is located immediately below the rock-filled concrete faced Paloona Dam which forms Lake Paloona. Water from the lake is fed to the power station by a short single penstock under the dam.

The station output, estimated to be  annually, is fed to TasNetworks' transmission grid via an 11 kV/110 kV Siemens generator transformer to the outdoor switchyard.

See also

 List of power stations in Tasmania

References

Hydroelectric power stations in Tasmania
Northern Tasmania
Energy infrastructure completed in 1972